The Lady Who Dared is a 1931 American pre-Code drama film directed by William Beaudine and starring Billie Dove, Sidney Blackmer and Conway Tearle.

Print survival, Library of Congress and Turner.

Plot
Blackmail prompts a smuggler into obtaining incriminating photos of a diplomat's wife, but he falls in love with her instead.

Cast
 Billie Dove as Margaret Townsend 
 Sidney Blackmer as Charles Townsend 
 Conway Tearle as Jack Norton 
 Judith Vosselli as Julianne Boone-Fleming  
 Cosmo Kyrle Bellew as Seton Boone-Fleming 
 Ivan F. Simpson as Butler  
 Mathilde Comont as Chambermaid 
 Lloyd Ingraham as Farrell

References

Bibliography
 Marshall, Wendy L. William Beaudine: From Silents to Television. Scarecrow Press, 2005.

External links

period lobby poster

1931 films
American drama films
American black-and-white films
1931 drama films
1930s English-language films
Films directed by William Beaudine
Warner Bros. films
Films with screenplays by Kathryn Scola
1930s American films